Jameh Mosque of Fathabad is related to the Qajar dynasty, which is located in the village of Fathabad, in the central part of the Ferdows County.

Sources 

Mosques in Iran
Mosque buildings with domes
National works of Iran